The 1895 America's Cup occurred just two years after the 1893 America's Cup  pitting the New York Yacht Club against the Royal Yacht Squadron. The 1895 race was between the Herreshoff designed sloop Defender owned by Charles Oliver Iselin, William Kissam Vanderbilt, and Edwin Dennison Morgan from the New York Yacht Club, and the Watson designed Valkyrie III owned by Lord Dunraven of the Royal Yacht Squadron.

The competitors

The match

The races

First race
The first race, on September 7, 1895, was set to be a windward-leeward course of fifteen miles length. The Weather for the day was described as light and shifting wind. In the first leg of the course the racing was close with Defender taking a slight lead by the windward mark. After rounding the mark the wind shifted, turning the running leg into a reaching leg, as a result Defender quickly increased its lead against Valkyrie III. Defender crossed the line eight minutes and forty-nine seconds ahead of "Valkyrie III" to win the first race.

Second race
The second race occurred on Tuesday September 10, 1895. The race was set as a triangle course with each leg having a length of ten miles. In the pre-start maneuvering, Valkyrie III'''s boom struck Defender, severing the starboard spreader. Valkyrie III led throughout the race, although Defender closed the gap between the boats in the second and third legs of the race. Valkyrie III crossed the line forty-seven seconds before Defender. However, after hearing the protest from Defender against Valkyrie III, the Race Committee awarded Defender the race as it ruled Defender had right of way over Valkyrie III as Defender was leeward of Valkyrie III at the time of collision.

Third race
The third race was sailed on Thursday September 12, 1895. After both Defender and Valkyrie III crossed the starting line sailing before the wind, Valkyrie III withdrew from the race claiming the committee could not guarantee a course that was free of spectator craft. Defender'' completed the race, winning the best of five regatta.

Aftermath

References

America's Cup regattas
New York Yacht Club
1895 in sailing
September 1895 sports events
1895 in American sports